The  is a Japanese family which claims its descent from Fujiwara no Toshihito by way of Katō Kagekado. The family entered Mutsu Province in the 14th century as subordinates of the Ōsaki clan. However, in 1532, they became retainers of the Date clan, and remained so until 1872. In the Sengoku era, the Katakura took part in all the major campaigns of the Date clan. The family's head, Katakura Kagetsuna, became renowned throughout the country, even receiving praise from Toyotomi Hideyoshi, who granted Kagetsuna a fief (thereby bypassing Kagetsuna's status as vassal to Date Masamune).

In the Edo period, the heads of the Katakura clan were hereditary karō in the Sendai Domain. Their personal fief was centered at Shiroishi Castle (modern-day Shiroishi, Miyagi).

Shigenobu Katakura, the current chief priest of Sendai's Aoba Shrine, is a direct descendant of this family.

Head Family
 Katakura Kagekatsu
 Katakura Kagefusa
 Katakura Kagenobu
 Katakura Kageharu
 Katakura Kagetsune
 Katakura Kagetoki
 Katakura Kageshige
 Katakura Kagesuke
 Katakura Kageyuki
 Katakura Kagehiro
 Katakura Kagemura
 Katakura Kageshige
 Katakura Kagetsuna
 Katakura Shigenaga
 Katakura Kagenaga (2nd)
 Katakura Muranaga
 Katakura Murayasu
 Katakura Muranobu
 Katakura Murasada
 Katakura Murakiyo
 Katakura Muratsune
 Katakura Kagesada
 Katakura Munekage
 Katakura Kuninori
 Katakura Kagenori
 Katakura Kagemitsu
 Katakura Kenkichi
 Katakura Nobumitsu
 Shigenobu Katakura

Others 
 Katakura Kita (1538-1610) was the half-sister of Katakura Kagetsuna and teacher of Date Masamune and Kagetsuna.

References
 "Katakura-shi" on Harimaya.com (9 March 2008)
 Family tree of the Katakura clan (9 March 2008)

 
Japanese clans